Krapa is situated in East Godavari district in Mummidivaram Mandal, in Andhra Pradesh State.

References

Villages in East Godavari district